William "Rusty" Russell (born August 16, 1963) is a former American football tackle who played one season with the Philadelphia Eagles of the National Football League (NFL).  He was drafted by the Philadelphia Eagles in the third round of the 1984 NFL Draft. He played college football at the University of South Carolina and attended Orangeburg-Wilkinson High School in Orangeburg, South Carolina. Russell was also a member of the Orlando Predators, Charlotte Rage and Florida Bobcats of the Arena Football League. He was named Second Team All-Arena in 1994.

References

External links
Just Sports Stats

Living people
1963 births
Players of American football from South Carolina
American football offensive tackles
African-American players of American football
South Carolina Gamecocks football players
Philadelphia Eagles players
Orlando Predators players
Charlotte Rage players
Florida Bobcats players
People from Orangeburg, South Carolina
Orangeburg-Wilkinson High School alumni
21st-century African-American people
20th-century African-American sportspeople